Uphams Corner station is an MBTA Commuter Rail station in Boston, Massachusetts. It serves the Fairmount Line. It is located on Dudley Street in the Uphams Corner area of the Dorchester neighborhood. It was reopened in 1979 after the line had been closed for 35 years. The station is fully accessible with two full-length high-level platforms and ramps to the street, which were added during a construction project that finished in 2007.

History

Original station

Service on the Fairmount Line (as the Dorchester Branch of the Norfolk County Railroad and later the New York and New England Railroad and New York, New Haven and Hartford Railroad) began in 1855, although it was frequently out of service until 1867. The service included a stop at Stoughton Street near Uphams Corner; a Cottage Street station may have also been briefly located a block to the north. The station was renamed Dudley Street after the street was renamed between Brook Avenue (the Roxbury/Dorchester border) and Uphams Corner in 1874.

Elimination of the busy Dudley Street grade crossing was long desired, but proved difficult because changing the grade of Dudley Street required modifying several nearby cross streets and numerous buildings. Construction to raise the tracks and lower Dudley Street began around September 1906. A temporary streetcar bypass track, railroad trestle, and station opened in January 1907. The railroad initially intended to continue using the 54-year-old wooden station building, which was insufficient to handle the 2,700 daily passengers at the station. After a May 1907 hearing, the railroad agreed to build a new stone station.

The grade crossing elimination was completed in 1908. It cost $500,000 and modified the grade of the tracks for nearly a mile from Massachusetts Avenue to Bird Street. The new stone station opened on April 14, 1909 at a cost of $18,000, then serving 65 trains per day. It was made of red brick with a concrete foundation, brownstone base, and limestone trim. A pedestrian tunnel under the tracks connected the platforms. 

On June 15, 1924, the station was again renamed as Uphams Corner to avoid confusion with Dudley Street Terminal. Undercut by streetcars, buses, and the Elevated for decades, service on the line ended in 1944.

MBTA station

The Dorchester Branch (also known as the Midland Route) was reopened as a bypass on November 3, 1979 during Southwest Corridor construction, including stops at Uphams Corner, Morton Street, and Fairmount. Uphams Corner was originally built at minimal cost, with small low-level platforms and staircases to Dudley Street. Intended to be only in service for several years, the station was not handicapped accessible.

Uphams Corner and Morton Street were dropped effective January 30, 1981 as part of systemwide cuts. Service over the route was intended to be temporary; however, it was popular with residents of the communities the line passed through. When the Southwest Corridor reopened on October 5, 1987, the Fairmount shuttle service was retained, with Uphams Corner and Morton Street renovated and reopened.

The station was rebuilt in 2005–2007 as part of the larger Fairmount Line Improvements project, which also included four new stations along the line. A groundbreaking was held on April 14, 2005. The rebuilding included new full-length high-level platforms, ramps to Dudley Street, canopies, and new lighting and signage. The fully accessible station was officially reopened on January 23, 2007.

In the mid-2010s, Uphams Corner station became locally known for high rates of heroin use at the lightly used and largely unpatrolled station.

References

External links

 MBTA – Uphams Corner
 Dudley Street entrance from Google Maps Street View

MBTA Commuter Rail stations in Boston
Stations along New York and New England Railroad lines
Railway stations in the United States opened in 1855
Railway stations in the United States opened in 1979
Railway stations in the United States opened in 1987
Railway stations closed in 1944
Railway stations in the United States opened in 1981